Kuchinotsu No. 37 is a tangor cultivar grown in Japan.

Genetics
Kuchinotsu No. 37 was created by crossing the "Kiyomi" tangor with the 'Encore' mandarin.

Hybrids
It is a parent of the setoka along with the "Murcott" tangor, and is a parent of the Japanese reikou.

Uses
The fruit and tree itself is quite obscure and little known. It is sometimes used to create new citrus hybrids.

See also
Japanese citrus
List of citrus fruits
Citrus

References

Citrus hybrids
Japanese fruit
Edible fruits
Fruit trees
Fruits originating in East Asia
Oranges (fruit)